"Superstition" is a song by American singer-songwriter Stevie Wonder. It was released on October 24, 1972, as the lead single from his fifteenth studio album, Talking Book (1972), by Tamla. The lyrics describe popular superstitions and their negative effects.

"Superstition" reached number one in the U.S. Billboard Hot 100 in January 1973  and on the soul singles chart. It was Wonder's first number-one single since "Fingertips, Pt. 2" in 1963. It peaked at number eleven in the UK Singles Chart in February 1973. In November 2004, Rolling Stone ranked the song number 74 on its list of the 500 Greatest Songs of All Time.  It was re-ranked number 73 on its 2010 list, and number 12 on its 2021 list. At the 16th Grammy Awards, the song earned Wonder two Grammys:  "Best Rhythm & Blues Song") and "Best R&B Vocal Performance, Male".

Writing and recording

Jeff Beck was an admirer of Wonder's music, and Wonder was informed of this prior to the Talking Book album sessions.  Though at this point he was playing virtually all of the instruments on his songs by himself, Wonder preferred to let other guitarists play on his records, and he liked the idea of a collaboration with Beck.  An agreement was quickly made for Beck to become involved in the sessions that became the Talking Book album, in return for Wonder writing him a song.

Between the album sessions, Beck came up with the opening drum beat. Wonder told Beck to keep playing while he improvised over the top of it. He improvised most of the song, including the riff, on the spot. Beck and Wonder created a rough demo for the song that day.

After finishing the song, Wonder decided that he would allow Beck to record "Superstition" as part of their agreement.  Originally, the plan was for Beck to release his version of the song first, with his newly formed power trio Beck, Bogert & Appice.  However, due to the combination of the trio's debut album getting delayed and Motown CEO Berry Gordy's prediction that "Superstition" would be a huge hit and greatly increase the sales of Talking Book, Wonder released the song as the Talking Book lead single months ahead of Beck's version, the latter being issued in March 1973 on the Beck, Bogert & Appice album.

The funky clavinet riff played on a Hohner Clavinet model C, the Moog synthesizer bass and the vocals were also performed by Wonder.  In addition, the song features trumpet and tenor saxophone, played respectively by Steve Madaio and Trevor Lawrence.

Reception
Cash Box described it as a "one of [Wonder's] most impressive releases to date" with an "accent...on funk."

Personnel
 Stevie Wonder – lead vocal, Hohner Clavinet, drums, Moog bass
 Trevor Lawrence – tenor saxophone
 Steve Madaio – trumpet

Chart performance

Weekly charts

Year-end charts

Certifications

Other recorded versions

The supergroup Beck, Bogert & Appice recorded Jeff Beck’s version of “Superstition” on their self titled 1973 album “Beck, Bogert & Appice”. The song had originated out of a jam session between Jeff Beck and Stevie Wonder, with Beck introducing Wonder to the song's iconic opening drum part. In return for Beck's work on Talking Book, Wonder had given the song to Beck to record and release as his own single, however delays in the release of the Beck, Bogert & Appice album meant that Wonder's version was released first.

 Stevie Wonder performed a live-in-the-studio version of "Superstition" on Sesame Street in 1973, episode 514.  This version later appeared on the collection Songs from the Street: 35 Years in Music.
 Stevie Ray Vaughan recorded a live version in 1986, which was released as a single from his album Live Alive. The accompanying music video features Vaughan and a stage crew setting up for a concert he planned to perform on Friday the 13th.  Many superstitious acts  and objects are featured, most notably an angry black cat intent on doing harm to Double Trouble, and Wonder appears at the end, holding the cat. This version is still played on classic rock radio, and is included on two of Vaughan's greatest hits compilations.

In popular culture
Wonder appeared in Bud Light commercials that debuted during the Super Bowl in 2013. As part of the "It's only weird if it doesn't work" campaign, which showed superstitious fans acting compulsively in an effort to guide their teams to victory, Wonder appeared as a witch doctor in New Orleans (where the 2013 Super Bowl took place). These fans would perform numerous superstitious acts in order to receive good luck charms from him.  The song "Superstition," specifically the beginning instrumental portion before Wonder's vocals kick in, plays throughout these commercials.

See also
 List of Billboard Hot 100 number-one singles of 1973

References

External links
 
 List of cover versions of "Superstition" at SecondHandSongs.com

Songs about luck
1972 singles
1972 songs
1973 singles
Billboard Hot 100 number-one singles
Cashbox number-one singles
Funk songs
Funk rock songs
Motown singles
Songs written by Stevie Wonder
Stevie Wonder songs
Tamla Records singles
Song recordings produced by Stevie Wonder